Classeya argyrodonta is a moth in the family Crambidae. It was described by George Hampson in 1910. It is found in the Democratic Republic of the Congo, Kenya, Mozambique, South Africa, Zambia and Zimbabwe.

References

Crambinae
Moths described in 1910